Carisa Bianchi is the former president and CEO of the Los Angeles branch of advertising agency TBWA\Chiat\Day.

Bianchi attended  Stanford University and California Polytechnic State University where she majored in communications and political science, with the original intention of working in advertising, she joined the advertising firm of Benton & Bowles in Los Angeles, working on Continental Airlines and Homes Savings of America. After two years, she left to join Doyle Dane Bernbach, working on GTE and The Southern California Gas Company. In 1989, she joined Chiat\Day Los Angeles, where she spent eight years working with clients such as Energizer Batteries, Sony PlayStation, Cherry Coke, and Sparkletts bottled water. Under her guidance, the Energizer Bunny campaign became one of the most successful advertising campaigns in U.S. history. The Sony PlayStation was also one of the most successful platform launches in the history of video games.

In 1998, Bianchi became the Managing Director of the newly re-opened TBWA\Chiat\Day office in San Francisco. In 2001, she was named one of Advertising Age’s "Women to Watch." She moved back to Los Angeles in 2002 to become Chief Strategy Officer, overseeing all strategic initiatives, including Account Planning, Business Development, and the Disruption and Connections initiative. In 2005, she was promoted to President of the Los Angeles office. In her first year as president, the agency launched The Disruption Consultancy, won the Visa account, won a record number of Grand EFFIEs and was named Adweek’s Agency of the Year.

In 2006, TBWA was named Global Agency of the Year by Adweek and Agency of the Year by SHOOT and Boards magazines.

Bianchi is an avid runner who competes in marathons.

References

 Living people
American advertising executives
 Year of birth missing (living people)
Businesspeople from Los Angeles